The franc was the currency of French West Africa. The French franc circulated, together with distinct banknotes from 1903 and coins from 1944. It was replaced by the CFA franc in 1945.

Coins
In 1944, aluminium-bronze 50 centimes and 1 franc coins were issued. These were the only coins struck before the introduction of the CFA franc.

Banknotes
The Banque de l'Afrique Occidentale began issuing notes in 1903. 100 franc notes were introduced that year, followed by 5 francs in 1904, 500 francs in 1912, 25 francs in 1917, 1000 francs in 1919 and 50 francs in 1920. 10 franc notes were introduced in 1943. In 1944, the government issued notes for 50 centimes, and 1 and 2 francs. The notes of the Banque de l'Afrique Occidentale continued to circulate after the introduction of the CFA franc.

References

External links

Currencies of Africa
Modern obsolete currencies
Franc
1903 establishments in French West Africa
1945 disestablishments in French West Africa